The Essential Charles Eastman (Ohiyesa) (2007, World Wisdom) is a compilation of the writings of Charles Eastman. A 19th-century Native American author and activist, Eastman lived both in the world of the Santee Dakota and the world of contemporary non-Indian America.  His writings are of historical significance, providing a glimpse of Native American life during a turbulent time, as well as an explanation of the spiritual traditions of the Sioux people.

Awards
Winner - Silver Midwest Book Award for “Religion/Philosophy/Inspiration” (2007)

See also
List of writers from peoples indigenous to the Americas
Native American studies

References

External links
 

Dakota culture
Non-fiction books about Native Americans
Books by writers from peoples indigenous to the Americas
Native American religion